Sobień (Soban 1372, castro Sobyen 1460) – Medieval castle in the San river valley, at the feet of Eastern Carpathian mountains, in the Manasterzec village in Lesko County, Subcarpathian Voivodeship.

History 
First mentioned as Soban, it was a Royal castle guarding the merchant route along the San River. The castle was built by order of King Casimir the Great in 1340.

In 1389  Władysław II Jagiełło conferred the castle to a noble family of Kmita.

The castle was destroyed in 1474 and again in 1512 by Hungarian forces. In 16th century the Kmita family sold the estates and the castle to Stadnicki family, who held it until 1713.

List of owners 
 Stefan - son of Wojosta from Sobniów first received the castle in 1359.
 1389–1580 Kmita Family.
 Jan Kmita (1330–1376) -  starost of Ruthenia and of Kraków
 Piotr Kmita (1348–1409) - voivode of Kraków
 Klemens Kmita - (1421) -  starost of Sanok.
 Jan Kmita - brother of Małgorzata Kmita.
 Małgorzata Kmita wife of Przedpełka Mościca from Wielki Koźmin
 Mikołaj Kmita from Wiśnicz - castellan of Przemyśl
 Jan Kmita (died 1450)
 Jan Kmita (died 1458/1460) - castellan of Lwow,
 Andrzej Kmita
 Dobiesław Kmita (died 1478) - voivode of Lublin
 Jan and Stanisław Kmita
 Maciej Kmita - podkomorzy (chamberlain) of Sanok
 Stanisław Kmita (ok. 1450–1511) -  castellan of Sanok, Voivode of Ruthenia
 Piotr Kmita Sobieński (1477–1553) - Grand Marshal of the Crown, Voivode of Krakow
 Barbara Kmita z Felsztyna
 1580–1713 Stadnicki Family
 1713–1803 Ossoliński, Mniszech families - as dowry of Teresa Stadnicka to her husband Józef Kanty Ossoliński
 1803–1939 Krasicki Family from Sienna - as dowry of Julia Teresa Wandalin-Mniszech

See also
Castles in Poland

References 

Castles in Podkarpackie Voivodeship
14th century in Poland
Casimir III the Great